Limnichus is a genus of beetles belonging to the family Limnichidae.

Species:
 Limnichus angustulus
 Limnichus aurosericeus

References

Limnichidae
Byrrhoidea genera